The 1985 Alabama Crimson Tide football team (variously "Alabama", "UA", "Bama" or "The Tide") represented the University of Alabama in the 1985 NCAA Division I-A football season. It was the Crimson Tide's 93rd overall and 52nd season as a member of the Southeastern Conference (SEC). The team was led by head coach Ray Perkins, in his third year, and played their home games at both Bryant–Denny Stadium in Tuscaloosa and Legion Field in Birmingham, Alabama. They finished the season with a record of nine wins, two losses and one tie (9–2–1 overall, 4–1–1 in the SEC) and with a victory in the Aloha Bowl over USC.

Highlights of the 1985 season included a last-second, 20–16 comeback victory on Labor Day over Georgia to open the season. The 1985 edition of the Iron Bowl against Auburn is regarded as one of Alabama's most dramatic victories in the history of the series. In the game, Alabama led 16–10 after three quarters, but saw four lead changes in the fourth quarter, including two in the final minute. It ended with Van Tiffin's 52-yard field goal as time expired to give Alabama a 25–23 victory. Tiffin's field goal is remembered simply as "The Kick" in Alabama lore.

Due to NCAA sanctions that led to the forfeit of Alabama's 1993 17–17 tie with Tennessee, and college football's adoption of an overtime that does not allow ties, the 14–14 tie with LSU remains the last official tie in school history.

Schedule

Roster

Rankings

Game summaries

Texas A&M

at LSU

vs. Auburn

    
    
    
    
    
    
    
    
    
    

Van Tiffin kicked his fourth field goal of the game, from 52 yards out, as time expired to give Alabama the Iron Bowl victory.

vs. USC (Aloha Bowl)

References
General

 

Specific

Alabama
Alabama Crimson Tide football seasons
Aloha Bowl champion seasons
Alabama Crimson Tide football